John Oceguera (born 1968 in Reno, Nevada) is a Democratic politician.  He represented Clark County District 16 in the Nevada Assembly from 2001 to 2013 and was elected speaker of the Assembly in 2011. Oceguera is a member of the Walker River Paiute tribe, and is the first Native American to serve as Speaker in Nevada history.

2012 U.S. House campaign

Oceguera was the 2012 Democratic nominee for Nevada's 3rd congressional district, challenging incumbent Republican nominee Joe Heck. He announced he was running on July 18, 2012. He lost his bid for the house failing to unseat Dr. Joe Heck as congressman for the 3rd District.

Personal
He lives in Northwest Las Vegas with his wife, Janie, and their three young children: Jackson, Jillian, and Jameson.

References

External links
John Oceguera at the Nevada Assembly, official government legislative profile
 
Campaign contributions at OpenSecrets.org

1968 births
Living people
Politicians from Reno, Nevada
Native American state legislators
Speakers of the Nevada Assembly
Democratic Party members of the Nevada Assembly